Deepika Mahila Sanghati (DMS) is a women-run NGO (non-governmental organization) in the city of Rourkela, in sector 2. It has effective contributions towards welfare of women and their empowerment. This NGO plays a major role in corporate social responsibility (CSR) programs associated with SAIL (Rourkela Steel Plant).

Activities
Deepika Mahila Sanghati was one of the main pioneer organizations for the opening of Deepika English Medium School in 1976. Now two schools — Deepika Ispat Siksha Sadan and Beginners Academy — are run by DMS.

The Masala and Medical units continue to touch all in Rourkela and nearby villages. With the patronage of RSP CSR departments, units like Hastakargha, sanitary napkin and Phenyl are operating from Deepika Mahila Jagriti Sansthan, Sec-2 Rourkela. A snacks selling outlet 'Swalpahar' has been opened in the IGH campus to take care of the needs of patients and attendants. All these units employ or train needy local women with an aim to make them independent and self sufficient.

Staff
Presently Suman Lata is the acting president of Deepika Mahila Sanghati, with Anuradha Banerjee and Minakshi Mahapatra as vice presidents, Sujata Khuntia as secretary, Namita Mahapatra as joint secretary, Poonam Shah as treasurer, and Rashmi Das as joint treasurer.

See also
 Deepika English Medium School
 Rourkela Steel Plant
 Home and Hope, Rourkela

References

Education in Rourkela
Rourkela
Year of establishment missing